The 1975 Virginia Slims of Akron was a women's tennis tournament played on indoor courts at the Richfield Coliseum in Akron, Ohio in the United States that was part of the 1975 Virginia Slims circuit. It was the third edition of the tournament and was held from February 3 through February 9, 1975. Chris Evert won the singles title and the accompanying $15,000 first-prize money.

Finals

Singles
 Chris Evert defeated  Margaret Court  6–4, 3–6, 6–3
 It was Evert's 2nd singles title of the year and the 41st of her career.

Doubles
 Françoise Dürr /  Betty Stöve defeated  Chris Evert /  Martina Navratilova 7–5, 7–6

References

Virginia Slims of Akron
Virginia Slims of Akron
Tennis tournaments in Ohio
Virginia Slims of Akron
Virginia Slims of Akron